Mihajlo Nešković (born 9 February 2000) is a Serbian professional footballer who plays for Serbian club Voždovac.

Club career

Vojvodina
On 21 October 2016 Nešković made his debut for Vojvodina, in 3:1 home win against Voždovac. In June 2017, Nešković signed his first professional contract, penning a three-year-deal with the club.

Voždovac 
After 6 years in Vojvodina, on 13 September 2022 Nešković signed for Voždovac. He signed a two-year-deal with the club.

Career statistics

Honours
Vojvodina
Serbian Cup: 2019–20

References

External links
 
 
 
 

2000 births
Living people
People from Šid
Serbian footballers
Serbia youth international footballers
FK Vojvodina players
FK Inđija players
Serbian SuperLiga players
Association football midfielders
Serbia under-21 international footballers